Nebria coiffaiti is a species of ground beetle from Nebriinae subfamily that is endemic to Turkey.

References

coiffaiti
Beetles described in 1983
Beetles of Asia
Endemic fauna of Turkey